BOCU may refer to:
Binary Ordered Compression for Unicode
Borough Operational Command Unit/Basic Command Unit
Ashiko called the bocu in Cuba